By the Throat may refer to:

By the Throat (Eyedea and Abilities album)
By the Throat (Ben Frost album)
"By the Throat", song by Cows from Daddy Has a Tail and Old Gold 1989–1991
"By the Throat", song by Chvrches from The Bones of What You Believe
"By the Throat", song by Pretty Girls Make Graves from Good Health (album)